Chenoise is a former commune in the Seine-et-Marne department in the Île-de-France région in north-central France. On 1 January 2019, it was merged into the new commune Chenoise-Cucharmoy. The inhabitants are called Chenoisiens.

The Château de Chenoise was the seat of the aristocratic Le Cat d'Hervilly family. After Louis Charles d'Hervilly fled France as an émigré, the château was confiscated and sold in 1793, but it was purchased by Adèle de Bellegarde and her sister Aurore, daughters of Louis Charles' sister Marie Charlotte Adélaïde Le Cat d'Hervilly.

See also
Communes of the Seine-et-Marne department

References

External links

1999 Land Use, from IAURIF (Institute for Urban Planning and Development of the Paris-Île-de-France région) 
 

Former communes of Seine-et-Marne
Populated places disestablished in 2019